Dr. Mohammad Karamudini (born 1955) is an Iranian writer, translator, science journalist and lecturer. He is the writer and translator of numerous articles and books in Persian on biology and biology education. He authored or translated more than 37 science books and many more articles in Persian publications. He is the recipient of numerous awards including "The Best Book of The Year" (three times: 2006, 2010, 2011 and 2017), "Roshd Festival for The Best Educational Books" (three times: 2002, 2011 and 2013) and "Festival for Best University Textbooks" (in 2012).
Mohammad Karamudini is also a founder of Iranian Biology Olympiad and had been head of the national scientific committee of Iranian Biology Olympiad for 20 years.

Career
Mohammad Karamudini began his career in science education as a biology teacher in Iranian high schools in 1974. During his career, he has received numerous awards for his teaching performance among which is

 the "Distinguished Teaching Award" from the "Ministry of Education", (1991) 
 Curriculum Development Center's outstanding educator and researcher, (2001)
 the most outstanding researcher of the Organization for Educational Research and Planning, (2002)
Before his retirement in July 2006, Mohammad Karamudini was head of Biology Department, Organization for Educational Research and Planning in Iran for 10 years.

Books and publications
Mohammad Karamudini has over 30 publications in the Persian. He has several papers in English, including:
 "Developing Biology Education in Developing Countries" presented in BioEd2000 in Paris, (2000)
 "Project-Based Learning in Science Education" presented in the 3ed International Conference on Science and Technology Education in East London, South Africa, (2003)

His book, the "Photosynthesis", brought to him the honor of being elected as the best author of educational publications for secondary students in 2003.

Some books in Persian
 "A Collection of Articles", Rahaveard, 1992;
 "Plant Biology, A Student Guide and Workbook", Fatemi Publisher, 2000;
 "Photosynthesis", Mehranb-e Ghalam, 2002;
 "Sokhan: Great encyclopedia of Persian Words", An 8 Volume Book, Elmi Publisher, (Group Work), 2002;
 "Biology", Madreseh Publisher, (Translated), 2003;
 "Animal Show", Ofogh, A 6 volume Book, (Translated), 2005;
 "Plants", Entesharat-e Fanni-e Iran, (Translated), 2005;
 "Ecology", Fatemi Publisher, (Translated), 2009;
 "Biological Sciences, A Textbook for 9th Graders", Chap Va Nashr Publication Co., (Group Work);
 "Biology and Lab(1), A textbook for 10th gradres", Chap Va Nashr Publication Co., (Group Work);
 "Biology and Lab(2), A textbook for 11th graders", Chap Va Nashr Publication Co., (Group Work);
 "Biology, A textbook for Preuniversity Students", Chap Va Nashr Publication Co., (Group Work);
 "Biological Sciences, A teachers book for Grade 9th", Chap Va Nashr Publication Co., (Group Work);
 "Biology and Lab, A Teachers Book for Grade 10th", Chap Va Nashr Publication Co., (Group Work);
 "Biology and Lab, A teachers Book for Grade 11th", Chap Va Nashr Publication Co., (Group Work);
 "Ecology and Animal Behavior", Fatemi Publisher,
 "Biology", Fatemi Publisher,
 "Encyclopedia of Science for Children", Ofogh Publisher, (Group Work), (Translated), Coming Soon;
 "Ethology", Fatemi Publisher;
 "Living as Butterlflies Do: A Collection of Articles", Khane-ye Zist Shensi, 2012

References

External links
karamudini.com, Mohammad Karamudini's website.
, The Teaching Aids Publication Bureau.
, Mohammad Karamudini's Blog.

Iranian educators
Iranian translators
1955 births
Living people
People from Sirjan
Iran's Book of the Year Awards recipients